The CAF Urbos is a family of trams, streetcars, and light rail vehicles built by CAF. The Basque manufacturer CAF previously manufactured locomotives, passenger cars, regional, and underground trains. In 1993, CAF started building trams for Metrovalencia, with the delivery of 16 trams until 1999. This was a variant of a Siemens design and some components were delivered by Siemens, including bogies and traction motors. This design was also sold to Lisbon Trams in 1995; CAF then decided to design and build the Urbos in-house.

There are three generations of the CAF Urbos, namely the Urbos 1, Urbos 2, and Urbos 3. The first generation was ordered by the Bilbao tram operator, who received eight trams between 2002 and 2004. The second generation was sold to other operators in Spain, and the third generation is sold in Spain, elsewhere in Europe, the United States, Australia and in the UK. Manufacturing locations include Beasain, Zaragoza and Linares, Spain; Elmira, New York, USA; Hortolandia, Brazil; Newport, UK; Huehuetoca, Mexico; and Bagnères-de-Bigorre, France.

CAF Urbos 1 

This series was only sold to Euskotren Tranbia to operate tram services in Bilbao. The original Bilbao tram system was shut down in 1964 and the second generation opened in December 2002 with extensions in 2004.

CAF Urbos 2

In operation

Withdrawn

CAF Urbos 3 

The CAF Urbos 3 is the successor of the Urbos 2; all new sales are of Urbos 3.

CAF has developed an option to build 'Greentech Freedrive' lithium-ion supercapacitors and batteries into the Urbos 3, allowing brief operation without an external electrical supply. This ACR system (Acumulador de Carga Rápida) allowed the tramway operator in Seville to remove the overhead wires in key locations during Holy Week 2011. It has also been used in Luxembourg, Granada, Zaragoza and the West Midlands.

Urbos 70 and Urbos 100

Design flaws 
In December 2017, the Besançon Tramway in Besançon, France, discovered cracks in their Urbos 3s vehicles around the bogie box area of the bodies, which in December 2020 CAF paid for remedial work to be performed with each unit affected requiring one month downtime for the work to be completed.

On 11 June 2021, the West Midlands Metro (operating between Birmingham and Wolverhampton, England) were forced to suspend their services due to similar cracks being discovered in the bogie box areas of their Urbos 3s vehicles, with ongoing investigations continuing to identify any other issues relating to the cracks and to find options for remedial works to be performed.

Following on from these instances, in November 2021 the New South Wales transport minister Rob Stokes announced that the Sydney L1 Dulwich Hill Line would be decommissioned for up to 18 months, due to serious design flaws in all 12 of the CAF Urbos 3s tram sets that were running on the line. Stokes stated that the flaws (in the bogie boxes) were likely to be far broader in scope than those identified in Sydney due to the thousands of the same tram type operated around the world.

Similar issues relating to cracks in the bogie box area are currently being discovered in the Urbos 3 vehicles supplied to the Belgrade Tramway Network.

The discovery of further cracks in the West Midlands trams lead to the service being suspended again from 12 November 2021 to December 2021.  

Following vehicle inspections, services in the West Midlands were again suspended on 20 March 2022 until further notice due to cracks described by the operator as 'bodywork cracks'.  Midland Metro was working directly with the manufacturer to assess the safety and operational impact.

Urbos AXL 

Vehicles in the Urbos AXL series have larger modules and railway-style pivoting axle bogies. This type of trams are currently in use only in two Northern European countries:
 Tallinn, Estonia, (20 trams)
 Stockholm, Sweden (22)

Urbos TT 
The Urbos TT series is built with tram-train technology, connecting existing heavy rail infrastructure directly to urban tramway systems.
 Cádiz, Spain (7 vehicles)

Urbos LRV 

A three-section articulated car supported by three bogies, the LRV variant of Urbos is designed for the North American market and is customizable.
 Houston, Texas, USA (39 vehicles)

LRTA 13000 class (Metro edition) 

The LRTA 13000 class is a high-floor light rail vehicle variant of the Urbos, with 120 units were ordered for the LRT Line 1 medium-capacity rail system in Metro Manila, Philippines. It was designed by CAF along with Mitsubishi Corporation and were built in CAF's facility in Huehuetoca, Mexico. The first two trainsets of 8 cars have arrived in January 2021. These are expected to enter service by 2022 and the delivery for all 120 units shall be completed by 2022. Once all the trainsets have entered service, they will eventually replace the aging LRTA 1000 class LRVs which are nearing 40 years old.

References

External links 

 CAF website

Electric multiple units of the United States
Tram vehicles
Light rail vehicles
CAF rolling stock
Train-related introductions in 2002
Tram vehicles of Serbia
600 V DC multiple units
750 V DC multiple units
Rolling stock of the Philippines
Multiple units of Sweden
Electric multiple units of Spain